Antonio Baldi (c.1692–1768) was an Italian painter and engraver of the late-Baroque period. He was born at Cava de' Tirreni in the kingdom of Naples. After training under Solimena, he became a pupil of Andreas Magliar and studied the art of engraving. He chiefly resided at Naples, where he occasionally worked as a scenic designer in collaboration with Vincenzo Re. He died in Naples in 1768.

Notes

References 

1690s births
1768 deaths
18th-century Italian painters
Italian male painters
Italian engravers
Italian Baroque painters
Painters from Naples
18th-century Italian male artists